The 1997 World Judo Championships were the 20th edition of the World Judo Championships, and were held in Paris, France in 1997.

Medal overview

Men

Women

Medal table

Results overview

Men

60 kg

65 kg

71 kg

78 kg

86 kg

95 kg

+95 kg

Open class

Women

48 kg

52 kg

56 kg

61 kg

66 kg

72 kg

+72 kg

Open class

External links
 
 Competition Results - 1997 World Judo Championships (International Judo Federation) (Archived)

World Championships
World Judo Championships
World Judo Championships
World
International sports competitions hosted by France
Judo in Paris